Rangitata is a settlement in New Zealand. The Rangitata River is located 3 kilometers north of the town and 10.7 kilometers north of Orari.

Demographics

Rangitata had a population of 1,653 at the 2018 New Zealand census, an increase of 153 people (10.2%) since the 2013 census, and an increase of 432 people (35.4%) since the 2006 census. There were 687 households. There were 837 males and 816 females, giving a sex ratio of 1.03 males per female. The median age was 50.7 years (compared with 37.4 years nationally), with 300 people (18.1%) aged under 15 years, 186 (11.3%) aged 15 to 29, 687 (41.6%) aged 30 to 64, and 480 (29.0%) aged 65 or older.

Ethnicities were 90.7% European/Pākehā, 5.4% Māori, 1.3% Pacific peoples, 6.5% Asian, and 2.7% other ethnicities (totals add to more than 100% since people could identify with multiple ethnicities).

The proportion of people born overseas was 18.0%, compared with 27.1% nationally.

Although some people objected to giving their religion, 45.4% had no religion, 46.3% were Christian, 0.5% were Hindu, 0.2% were Buddhist and 1.1% had other religions.

Of those at least 15 years old, 243 (18.0%) people had a bachelor or higher degree, and 303 (22.4%) people had no formal qualifications. The median income was $32,000, compared with $31,800 nationally. The employment status of those at least 15 was that 600 (44.3%) people were employed full-time, 198 (14.6%) were part-time, and 24 (1.8%) were unemployed.

References

Timaru District
Populated places in Canterbury, New Zealand